Woongarra may refer to:
 Woongarra, Queensland, a locality in the Bundaberg Region, Australia
 Woongarra (Pemberton) railway line, a railway line in Queensland, Australia
 Shire of Woongarra, a former local government area in Queensland, Australia